D315 is a state road branching off from D409 state road connecting it to Trogir. The road is 2.7 km long.

The road, as well as all other state roads in Croatia, is managed and maintained by Hrvatske ceste, state owned company.

Road junctions

Sources

State roads in Croatia
Transport in Split-Dalmatia County